Conor Michael Sheary (born June 8, 1992) is an American professional ice hockey winger who is currently playing for the  Washington Capitals in the National Hockey League (NHL). He has previously played for the Pittsburgh Penguins with whom he won two Stanley Cups.

Playing career

Amateur
As a senior at the University of Massachusetts-Amherst, Sheary played in all 34 games leading the team in points with 28 on nine goals and a squad-best 19 assists. Sheary's collegiate career highs include: 2 Goals – vs. Cornell (12/29/11); 3 Assists – 2x Last at Northeastern (1/4/14); 3 Points – 4x – Last at Northeastern (1/4/14).

Professional
Undrafted, Sheary played collegiate hockey with the University of Massachusetts Amherst of the Hockey East. At the conclusion of his senior season with the Minutemen, Sheary made his professional debut with the Wilkes-Barre/Scranton Penguins of the AHL at the tail end of the 2013–14 season, and remained with the club into the post-season to produce 11 points in 15 games.

On July 1, 2015, Sheary was signed to a two-year entry-level contract with the NHL affiliate of Wilkes-Barre, the Pittsburgh Penguins.

Pittsburgh Penguins
In the following 2015–16 season, Sheary was recalled from the AHL to the Pittsburgh Penguins on December 15, 2015, and made his NHL debut on December 16, 2015, in a 3–0 loss against the Boston Bruins. On December 18, 2015, he scored his first NHL goal on goaltender Tuukka Rask of the Boston Bruins and registered his first NHL assist in the same game.

On March 13, 2016, Sheary recorded his first multi-goal game, scoring 2 goals against the New York Rangers at Madison Square Garden against goaltender Henrik Lundqvist. He would then record his first career playoff goal vs Lundqvist on April 21, 2016. On June 1, 2016, Sheary scored the game-winner, in overtime, to win against the San Jose Sharks 2–1 in the Stanley Cup Finals. On June 12, 2016, Sheary won the Stanley Cup with the Pittsburgh Penguins in a 3–1 victory against the San Jose Sharks.

In the 2016–17 NHL season, Sheary continued to play alongside Sidney Crosby for the entire year, getting 23 goals and 30 assists for 53 points. Sheary got his first 3-point game on January 16, 2017, against the Washington Capitals. The Penguins won the game 8–7 in overtime, with Sheary scoring the overtime winner. The Pittsburgh Penguins later went on to win the Stanley Cup, giving Sheary his second Stanley Cup ring.

On July 30, 2017, the Penguins re-signed Sheary to a three-year, $9 million contract worth $3 million annually.

Buffalo Sabres
On June 27, 2018, Sheary, along with teammate Matt Hunwick, were traded to the Buffalo Sabres for a conditional fourth-round pick in the 2019 NHL Entry Draft. In doing so, the Penguins cleared over $5 million in salary cap space. In the 2018–19 season, Sheary played in a top-nine forward role, contributing with 14 goals and 34 points through 78 games as the Sabres missed the post-season.

In the following 2019–20 season, his final season before approaching free agency, Sheary continued to play on the third-line, adding 9 goals and 19 points in 55 games.

Return to Pittsburgh
At the NHL trade deadline, Sheary was re-acquired by the Pittsburgh Penguins along with Evan Rodrigues in exchange for Dominik Kahun on February 24, 2020. Sheary recorded 23 points in 63 games with the Buffalo Sabres and the Penguins during the season but remained unsigned into the offseason.

Washington Capitals
On December 22, 2020, Sheary signed a one-year, $735,000 contract as a free agent with the Washington Capitals.

On April 14, 2021, Sheary agreed to a two-year, $3 million extension with the Capitals.

Personal life
Conor Michael Sheary was born June 8, 1992, in Winchester, Massachusetts to Kevin and Robin Sheary. He grew up in Melrose, Massachusetts with his two sisters, Caitlin and Courtney. Sheary dated Jordan Sullivan since their years at Cushing Academy in 2008. They became engaged in March 2016 and were married in August 2018. They welcomed their first child, a daughter, in February 2021.

In an interview in November 2017, Sheary admitted that commentators, fans, and players have been mispronouncing his name. His name is pronounced  SHARE-ee not SHEER-ee.

Career statistics

Awards and honors

References

External links 
 

1992 births
American men's ice hockey left wingers
Buffalo Sabres players
Ice hockey players from Massachusetts
Living people
People from Winchester, Massachusetts
Pittsburgh Penguins players
Sportspeople from Middlesex County, Massachusetts
Stanley Cup champions
UMass Minutemen ice hockey players
Undrafted National Hockey League players
Washington Capitals players
Wilkes-Barre/Scranton Penguins players